The Westminster Scholars War Memorial, also known as the Crimea and Indian Mutiny Memorial, is an 1861 memorial in London.  It commemorates 19 former pupils of Westminster School who died in two wars: ten in the Crimean War of 1854–56, and nine in the Indian Mutiny of 1857–58.  It was designed in High Victorian Gothic style by George Gilbert Scott, who was Surveyor of the Fabric of Westminster Abbey from 1849 to 1878.

The memorial is installed on a triangular plot outside the west entrance to Westminster Abbey, and north of the gatehouse leading to Dean's Yard.  It stands near where Broad Sanctuary to the north becomes Victoria Street to the west, with a short road The Sanctuary running to the south and east.

It became a Grade II listed building in 1958.  Westminster Abbey and the Dean's Yard gatehouse (also designed by Scott in Gothic style, and constructed in 1853–54) are each separately listed, at Grade I and Grade II respectively.  Westminster School is still based in the Abbey's precincts.

Description
The memorial comprises a tall pink Peterhead granite pillar, carved with a ring of blank shields about half way up, topped by a Portland stone capital and statues. The statue atop the column was carved by J. R. Clayton and depict St George slaying the dragon, below which is a lantern tier with four Gothic niches, housing statues of St Edward the Confessor (facing east), Henry III (west), Elizabeth I (south) and Queen Victoria (north), all carved by J. Birnie Philip, above a highly decorated floral capital. The pillar stands on a stone base with four granite pilasters, each topped by a stone statue of a lion, resting on three octagonal steps, ringed by iron railings.

Inscriptions
An inscription on the memorial's north side reads:

Its south side displays the text:

An inscription on its west side reads:

The opposite (east) side's inscription says:

See also
 1861 in art

References

 Crimean War and Indian Mutiny Memorial, National Heritage List for England,  Historic England
 Westminster School – Crimea and Indian Mutiny Memorial, War Memorials Register, Imperial War Museums
 Westminster Scholars Memorial, War Memorials Online

External links

 The Westminster Column – Westminster (London, UK) at Waymarking
 Westminster Scholars Memorial – The Sanctuary, Westminster, London, UK at Waymarking

1861 establishments in England
1861 sculptures
Grade II listed buildings in the City of Westminster
Grade II listed statues in the City of Westminster
Monuments and memorials in London
Outdoor sculptures in London
Sculptures of lions